Private Nanshan Senior High School (NSSH) is a school in Zhonghe District, New Taipei, Taiwan. The current principal is Wu Po Chen (吳柏成).

School badge
The school badge of NSSH is a stylised version of the ancient rendition of the Chinese word 山, meaning mountain. The three triangles symbolise the Chinese belief of a cyclic interaction between the sky, mankind and earth (天、地、人), and also represent the school's hope to instill in students the ideal of oneness between nature and man (民胞物與、天人合一) derived from traditional Chinese thought.

History 
In 1941, Nanshan was established at No. 112, Fu-Hsin Central Road, Shanghai as the Cheng-Te Vocational School. Following the celebration of China's victory in WWII and president Chiang Kai-shek's 60th birthday, the school was then renamed "Nanshan Private Business School" in 1946. 1946 is considered NSSH's year of establishment as this was the year when the Nanshan name was given to the school. When the Chinese Nationalist government retreated to Taiwan in 1949 as a result of its defeat in the Chinese Civil War, the school suspended all lessons.

Eight years later, in 1957, the school reopened as "Private Nanshan Industrial Vocational School" at its current location on Guangfu Road. Accepting both junior and senior high school students, about 250 students enrolled that year. Major faculties in the school included electrical engineering, civil engineering and textile engineering.

The business management faculty was established in 1961 and the school was renamed "Private Nanshan Business Vocational School". Later, in 1968, the school suspended its junior high section because of a change in government policy. The school's basketball team, the Nanshan Leopards, was established the year after.

The school was renamed "Private Nanshan Business Vocational High School" in 1971. In 1976, the arts faculty was established. Then, the establishment of the information technology faculty in 1987 was swiftly followed by that of the advertisement design department in 1988.

The arts faculty started taking in new students again in 1989 after a short one-year hiatus. However, the advertisement design, business management and international trade management faculties all stopped taking in new students that year. At the same time, the early childhood education and beauty faculties were established. 1989 also saw the establishment of the Nanshan kindergarten.

In 1991, Nanshan was renamed "Private Nanshan Senior High School", the name it retains till this day. The normal high school track was also introduced alongside the vocational track. Three years later, the vocational track was relegated to a side track of the NSSH system. The junior high section was also revived.

Later on, in 1997, a data processing faculty was established and the beauty faculty stopped taking in students. NSSH also started the Zhonghe Community University in 2000, sharing the NSSH campus. After that, in 2001, the school history hall and Jie-Shou Garden were established and a special music class was established. At the same time, the business management faculty was closed. That year, junior high student Tsai Yu-hsuan was awarded the Presidential Education Award.

In 2002, the school's mathematics and science elite class was introduced, aiming to provide an advanced Math and Science curriculum for students of higher ability compared to regular classes. This was followed in 2003 by the introduction of the bilingual elite class in the junior high section for students with better competence in English than their peers in other classes.

The school celebrated its 60th anniversary in 2006, commemorated by the completion of the Tzechiang building and Hsin Chien hall. Senior high student Hong Wei-kai was also recognised as the top student in Taipei County for achieving 73 points out of 75 in the college entrance exam. This was the first time an NSSH student had been recognised as such.

The next year, math and science elite student Lin Qi-yun obtained third place in the IChO and seventh place in the national chemistry camp for elite students. Lin was admitted to National Taiwan University two years early at the age of sixteen. That year, the Nanshan Leopards clinched their 4th High School Basketball League (HBL) title. Then, in 2008, they won the title again, securing consecutive titles for the first time. The Leopards went on to win the HBL title in 2012 and 2016, their 6th and 7th titles. NSSH is the only team in HBL history to have won seven titles.

In year 2014, Nanshan Senior High school has announced to join Sage, Strategy Alliance of Global educators. Since then, the school has developed more oversea education trips, and brought in some new educating methods.

In 2016, two of NSSH's senior high students scored a perfect score of 75 out of 75 in the college entrance examinations, a feat never before seen in NanShan history. NanShan was also recognised as the best-performing school in New Taipei City that year. The next year (2017), Nanshan advanced to the semi-final in both boys and girls basketball category, despite losing at finals and semi-finals respectively.

School chairmen
Shanghai era
 Mr. Chun, Tsao 
 Mr. Tieh-Wu, Hsuan 
Taiwan era
 Mr. Hsiung-Hsiang, Lin 
 Mr. Chung-Chi, Lin 
 Mr. Sen-Chi, Cheng 
 Mr. Chi-Chuan, Sun 
 Mr. Ji-Guang, Wang (current)

Principals
Shanghai era
 Mr. Chung-Chieh, Ying 
Taiwan era
 Mr. Chung-Chieh, Ying 
 Mr. Yu-Chi, Huang 
 Mr. Pin, Tsao 
 Mr. Yu, Chang
 Mr. Wen-Hua, Chang
 Mr. Chi-Chuan, Sun
 Mr. Ji-Guang, Wang
 Mr. Ming-Chen, Tsai
 Ms. Chan Lun, Ku (current)

Departments
 Kindergarten: established in 1989
 Primary after-school: after-school care provided for primary school students
 Junior high: established in 1994
 Senior high:
 Regular high school department established in 1991
 Computer science vocational department established in 1987
 Data processing vocational department established in 1997

School culture

Motto and spirit 
Visions:
 To build a school with aesthetic culture.
 To nurture the Nanshan student equipped with sufficient abilities to face the challenges of the future
 To nurture students who have the courage to handle one's duty in the modern era and the wisdom to solve the problems of the future "有膽識擔當時代責任、有智慧解決時代問題"
 To nurture students with morals and values to last a lifetime

Quality targets:
 Optimism
 Continuous improvement
 Righteousness
 Gratefulness

Policies:
 Fresh
 Fast
 Usefulness
 Simplicity

Major events 
NSSH holds many annual events. These include: 
 Nanshan GO Competition (Weichi)
 Karaoke competition
 Sports Day
 Star's Night: celebrities are invited to hold a concert
 CEEC/CAP/TCe Bless-For-Test Activities
 Nan Shan Model United Nations Conference
 Nan Shan Basketball Invitational Cup (once every four years)
 School Rally and English Day
 Clubs showcase
 Chinese, English, Hokkien speech, writing contest 
 3-day TOP English camp (Y7 and 10)
 "Easy" Scout camp (Year 7)
 Inter-class singing competition (Y7 and 10)
 Hong-Lu-Di Trip/Trip-Of-Forming-House (Y7)
 "Intermediate" Scout camp (Y8)
 Inter-class dance competition (Y8 and Y11)
 Inter-class recorder competition (Y8)
 3D2N junior high graduation trip (Y8)
 Graduation ceremony (Y9 and Y12)

 Last Night Party (Y12)
 2D1N midterm camp (a.k.a. Cao Mountain Camp) (Y9)
 "Iron Man" scout camp (Y9)
 2D1N mountain boot camp (Y10)
 Peking University Day (Y10 and 11)
 1D rifle training camp (Y11)
 4D3N senior high graduation trip (Y11)

Campus introduction 
There are currently seven major buildings in the main campus:
 Hsiung-Hsiang Building (熊祥大樓): Built in 1965, this building was named in memory of former chairman Mr Hsiung-Hsiang Lin. The aging three-floor building was rebuilt in 2002. It is currently occupied by the physical education department, healthcare centre, convenience store (bigger one) and Year 7 classes. The roof is used as a garden. 
 Tseng-Deh Building (正德大樓): Built in 1973, it currently houses the music classrooms, general affairs office, consultation centre, computer labs and staff room.
 Chung-Chi Building (崇智大樓): Built in 1995, this building is named after Mr Chung-Chi Lin, a former NSSH chairman. It currently houses some junior high classrooms, as well as the boys' basketball team's hostels and the multi-purpose science laboratories. The roof also holds an earth science classroom with a weather observation station and a greenhouse. 
 Science Building (大中至正樓): Officially named the "Ta-Chung-Chi-Cheng" building, this building has 10 floors above ground and 2 underground. Built in 2013, the basement houses the "mastery office" which is a studio for vocational students. A smaller library is also present on the first floor. The second to sixth floors house Year 9 and 10 classrooms, with laboratories on the seventh to tenth floors and a garden on the roof.
 Yo-Bao Building (幼保大樓): Currently houses kindergarten and after-school care departments.
 Tsao-Chun Building (曹俊大樓): Built in 1998 and named after NSSH's first chairman Mr. Chun Tsao. It is currently occupied by the Nanshan art gallery, Nanshan after-school care department, teaching affairs office, some Year 9 classrooms as well as the Year 11 and 12 classrooms. There is also an auditorium, reading room, two sky gardens on the fifth floor as well as another garden on the roof. The basement serves as a recycling centre and staff parking lot.
 Tze-Chiang Building and Hsin-Chien Centre (自強大樓、行健館): Built in 2006, this is the biggest building in the entire NSSH campus. The Tze-Chiang building contains the principal's office, secretary's office, accounting office and a staff room. It also holds the Year 7 and 8 classrooms, a 200-seater lecture hall and the main library. The Hsin-Chien centre holds the gym, dance room and changing rooms with showers. There is also a big stage where assemblies are held during inclement weather, a volleyball court, 5 half-basketball courts, a tennis court and table tennis room. On the ground floor beside basketball court there is a smaller convenience store stand.
Apart from its main campus, NSSH also has a secondary campus called Zhang-He Campus 2. This campus was rented from Zhang He Junior High School next door and can be accessed from Yi-yi gate. This campus is currently set aside as a parking lot for guests, garbage centre and school bus boarding area. It also has two full and five half-basketball courts as well as a soccer pitch. Starting from 2016, Zhang He took back part of the campus to build a central kitchen, forcing Nanshan to reduce the size of the soccer pitch.

In order to link the two schools' campuses together, a gate named Li-Li Gate exists to connect the two schools. It is usually not open unless in the case of a special condition. For instance, Nanshan does not have its own running track. Thus, whenever a running track is required, the school will have to open the gate to use Zhang He's running track.

School timetable 
Starting from 2014, following some feedback to the school's Student Affair Office, the duration of each period has been adjusted from 50 minutes to 45 minutes, with movement time in between periods adjusted. The general timetable is as follows.

For regular school weeks (September to mid-January, late February to June)

7:00- 7:30 Register

7:30- 8:00 Class Assembly / School Assembly (on Wednesday and every other Monday for juniors, every other Friday for seniors)

8:00- 8:20 Morning Long Break

8:20- 9:05 Period 1

9:05- 9:15 Movement time

9:15- 10:00 Period 2

10:00- 10:10 Movement time

10:10- 10:55 Period 3

10:55- 11:05 Movement time

11:15- 11:50 Period 4

11:50- 12:25 lunch time

12:25- 13:00 noon break

13:00- 13:10 Movement time

13:10- 13:55 Period 5

13:55- 14:05 Movement time

14:05- 14:50 Period 6

14:50- 15:00 Movement time

15:00- 15:45 Period 7

15:45- 16:00 Afternoon Long Break/School Cleanup

16:00- 16:45 Period 8
 Students may leave the school after Period 8 in August and mid-February. This is because these months are shortly after students go back to school following their holidays. The school thus decided to give some time for students to readjust to the strenuous timetable.
16:45- 16:55 Movement time

16:55- 17:40 Period 9
 Students from Years 7 to 11 may choose up to two days (or three days if special conditions are met, for example having already mastered the content of the night lessons) to leave at period 9, missing the remaining periods. Most students are Wednesday and Friday since the night courses on those two days are mostly more alternative.
17:40- 18:05 Dinner Time

18:05- 18:50 Night Long Break (Sports break)

18:50- 19:35 Period 10

19:35- 19:40 Movement time

19:40- 20:25 Period 11
 Students from Year 7 to 11 normally leave after this period.
20:25- 20:30 Movement time

20:30- 21:25 Period 12

School class system 
NSSH separates students into different groups of classes in order to provide the most suitable education to every individual student.

Year 7 and 8 
Every March, NSSH holds an entrance test open to all Year 6 students. Students who meet the criteria may be accepted into NSSH. The school separates its students into 4 different groups at entry.

The Mathematics Elites 
This class is usually thought to be the best class in the school as a result of the extra emphasis placed on mathematics and science by the Taiwanese education system. Students in this class have weekly lectures with famous professors or scientists. Students from this class usually perform the best academically although they might be slightly lacking in English. The school also sends students from this class to participate in the AMC8 Test and JHMC math contest.

In Year 8, students from this class are expected to form groups of up to three people to work on a science project and enter the National Science Fair Competition.

The Bilingual Elites 
The bilingual elite class is usually the most competent in English. The school provides over 6 hours of oral and grammatical instruction in English. This class is also the only class which has two tutors, one foreign and one Taiwanese.

The Linguistic Elites 
This class is the most knowledgeable regarding traditional Chinese language and literature. This class spends more time learning ancient Chinese poems, stories and novels.

The Creative Elites 
This class tier was originally named as "The Normal Classes". Generally, students from these classes do not do as well in academics as compared to the other classes. However, to discover these students' greatest potential, the students go through special classes such as video directing, music and aesthetics. The school also tries to push them to join the "Invention Fair" held in Taiwan.

Year 9 
When students enter Year 9, they will be separated into two groups of students, with more sub-groups.

Straight-Uppers 
Students meeting certain criteria who wish to finish their high school academics in NanShan are named Straight-Uppers. They generally have a less stressful academic life because they do not have to take the CAP test, which determines the Senior High School that a student goes to. The school tries to push students to begin learning the Year 10 and 11 curriculum before the end of year 9. Straight-Uppers are separated into four different tiers according to their performance at the Year 8 End-Of-Year evaluation. The highest tier requires the student to be in the top 15% of the cohort to qualify, while the lowest criterion requires the student to be in the top 80%.

Leavers 
Students who wish to take the CAP test and leave NanShan at year 10 or simply couldn't qualify the straight uppers are named the Leavers. The leavers tend to be at two extremes—on one hand containing the best students confident of entering schools better than NSSH, while on the other hand containing students that may not even meet the criteria of a Year 8 student.

Year 10 
When students enter Year 10, they are separated into two types of classes; one type containing the students continuing from Year 9 in NSSH, and the other type coming from other junior high schools. The first type finishes the Year 12 curriculum earlier and starts its reviewing process faster, while the second type will follow the regular speed and curriculum of other senior high schools.

Year 11 
When students enter Year 11, students need to choose their major. There are two choices, the social group and the science group. Straight Upper students are often expected to choose the science group.

Year 12 
Students of Year 12 are expected to commit themselves fully into the preparation of the College Entrance Test. After the end of the first semester, following the end of college entrance test, the school will offer courses such as training to become assistance staff in the Ironman Camp for Year 9 students. Many Year 12 students choose to join TTAT, a volunteer group formed by Year 12 students and Nanshan alumni to serve in school activities. However, those who fall short on their college entrance test might take a second chance which is the comprehensive test in the summer. Students choosing this path will have to study hard for the whole of Year 12.

Vocational School 
NSSH also has a vocational department. Two types of students are admitted, either students continuing from Year 9 or students from other junior highs. Two kinds of vocational educations are offered, one being computing and the other being data processing. These students have more lab experience classes such as circuit board assembly among others. However, these students are usually very weak when it comes to academics.

School services and fees 
School fees vary from year to year and type of classes. Generally, it costs about NT$55,000 (~US$2200) per half-year for juniors and NT$35,000 (US$1400) per half-year for seniors, excluding other miscellaneous costs which add up to about NT$5,000-8,000 (~US$170–270). The school is proud of the fact that it has never run into financial trouble. The school also subsidises the costs of some field trips or camps.

The school also provides a bus service which can pick up students from their doorsteps. The school bus fee varies from NT$3,000-13,000 (~US$120–520) per half-year.

The school offers lunch and dinner but requires students to pay an extra NT$480 (~US$17) per week. Otherwise, students can choose to consume their own home-cooked food. Although it is not recommended by the school, the convenience store within the school also sells a variety of lunchboxes, which cost more than the school lunch but is said to be much better in terms of taste. This service was discontinued at the beginning of the fall semester of 2018.

School provides Scholarships for students to pursue, ranging from NT$1,000 (~US$32) to NT$100,000 (~US$3,200, only distributed under one occasion in history).

There are water fountains all around the school, so students just need to bring their own water bottles. They may also purchase drinks and snacks from the school convenience store.

Academic system 
NanShan senior High school follows the local Taiwanese K-12 system. During year 7 to year 9, students are required to complete "9CC" curriculum while in year 10–12, those who follows normal high school path need to complete the followings:

*1 Applied Biology: Focusing on applying the theory taught in previous volumes into real practice.

*2 (x): Indicates which volume the content appears in.

*3 Some of the subjects does not contain the content of advanced volumes.

Some of the minor subjects have Curriculum overview too, it is available on Minister of Education's Website.

Students who chooses Vocational path including sports and data processing/ management are required to do their respective professional skill courses, in exchange of lesser amount in textbooks mentioned above.

House system and inter-house competition 

Year 9 straight-uppers are obligated to participate in the house system. Starting with an initial 6 houses in 2010, this was later increased to 8 and then 10 to cope with the growth in the number of students. However, in 2015, the number of straight-uppers was reduced so the Brown and Grey houses were deactivated. In 2016–17, the number of students increased drastically. Thus, not only were the two previously deactivated houses reactivated, but a brand new house was also established. The school currently has 11 houses: Red Fire, Blue Sea, Green Mountain, Yellow Stone, Black Wind, White Snow, Purple Light, Orange Flower, Brown Bear, Gray Wolf and Gold Hawk. Each house contains seven squads, with five to six members each. The houses compete against each other, following a scoreboard that calculates overall performance throughout the year. The House Leaders are elected according to the squad score. In May, there is a finale camp which determines 30% of the overall score. The champion house of Year 2016–17 was Gray Wolf House, with a narrow margin of 1 point beating runner-up Blue Sea House.

Stars are awarded to the top half of the houses, regardless of exact position. For 2016–17, Red Fire, Blue Sea, White Snow, Purple Light, Brown Bear and Gray Wolf Houses were awarded a star.

Houses traditional 
Due to the rather short years house system was introduced and the significant changing rate of house members every year, not many houses traditions were carried on. Still very few were present. For example, the White Snow House was considered to be a "steady house" which they won star prize every year, but not being winner's house for a single time, just like Arsenal F.C.; Yellow Stone house was considered a strong force, winning two top prize in 3 years duration (2013–14,2015–16), however, they did not even hit top 6 in the most recent year.

The Purple Light house was the representative of the scout club, generally. The first (Fu, 2012–13) to fourth (Yang, 2015–16) term house leaders were all scouts, however, the fifth term house leader wasn't, that is, these traditional are changeable, and generally has many exceptions. It is more like a psychological edge on "what our predecessors used to achieved, so we shall do the same".

Major activities

Castle Fight 

8 houses, grouped to battle A and battle B with 4 houses on the same battle field, will have to attack each other via the water balloon. The houses have to use bamboo sticks and ropes to construct a "castle tank" with two catapults on it. When the fight starts, two houses will be granted to attack, the other two will defend. The House Leader and the Deputy House Leader will sit on the two seats beside the House symbol flag.  The attacking side will have two Suppliers reloading the catapult, and four Attackers executing attack by launching the water balloon to the defending side. If the house leader or flag were hit, the attacking side wins point.  60 seconds per round, and after that, attack and defending team switch role. The game is decided on best-of-three, and the score will be calculated to the aggregate house final-reward.

The castle is very big, and thus required 30-35 people lifting it. The house leaders and the deputy house leaders surely needs courage to be on it. They have to keep the flag up since if the flag was hit and then fallen down, the house loses the round immediately.

Bicycle riding (18K or 36K) 
There are two bike riding competitions per year. The 18 K bike ride is basically a scavenger hunt, which requires a squad to follow the routine that school assigned, and enter a museum mid-way to finish the assignment. The scores are based on assignment performance unless a squad uses way over time. The house result will be the aggregate of all its associated squad. The 36 K bike ride is a combination of speed race and GPS hunt, whereas school doesn't provide maps and directions, but coordination. Each squad has to pass their assigned check point, or else the score will not be admitted.

In 2017 NanShan Straight-Upper Cup 18 K Bike ride compete, the seven students from Hwa Chong Institution were invited to join since the compete were held on the exchanging week. Leon Lee, Yu Han Lee, Chong Hui Feng and Max Wu joined squad 78 under the command of replica 15-16 Purple Light House Leader, Pin Yang, and eventually finished mid-table while Choon Wee Yeo, Derek Tay and Siu Ho Hin joined their respect buddy's squad. It is however yet to be confirmed if such activity will become tradition of the exchanging program. The 18 K compete is very important as it will be the major determination of the list of House Leader Squad and Deputy House Leader Squad.

MRT City Scavenger Hunt 

Students will be given a treasure booklet with 40 CPs, with questions or quests on each of the points. They will be instruct with the first CP they have to go, and then they need to move to the spot and complete the mission, then call HQ for the next checkpoint they have to go. HQ will send SMS to each squads every thirty minutes to inform the scoreline, and usually players need to move along with MRT, walking outside the station and explore near the station to complete a quest, thus, it is very entertaining.

Cao Mountain Camp (2D1N) 
The camp will be divided into two major parts. The first part of the activity is Skyline Day, whereas students experiencing many high-altitude facilities such as islands in the sky, Rappel wall, and so on. The second part of the activity is Mountain scavenger hunt, which school provides a GPS and much coordination, basically the mountain version of MRT city scavenger hunt. However, this time squads have the option to play some emergency missions when they pass the event area, completing them will result in major scoring bonus.

Iron Man Camp (3D2N) 
This camp is the finale battle of the entire school year, whereas two Houses are formed into a Consortium. As for year 2015–16, there are Human Consortium, Elf Consortium, Orc consortium and Dwarf consortium. The many activities include The journey: The Lord of the Rings which requires a consortium which has 14 squads in total to co-operate. Some squads ride bikes in the entire Yilan City, mountains and by the seashore to find the missing sequences which can convert as 5 points; some squads stay in the house castle to defend intruder, and of course some intrude others; some squad explore to the Doom's day Volcano to fight the Hurlocks, while the elite squad of the house challenge for jackpot games and earn gadget rings to become multiplier in scoreline. There are some side activities as well such as canoe building, kayaking, House Marathon and Caoling historical trail, which requires everyone to walk 8.4 km, climbing an about 400m tall mountain. The house annual final result is announced on the last day of the activity.

Conflicts of consortium on Iron Man Camp 
Consortium system was quite flawed as sometimes houses in same consortium suffer interest conflicts. For example, in the 2016 Iron man camp final, Orange Flower House and Purple Light house were formed as Human Consortium. On the House marathon contest, the orange flower house' member intentionally friendly fire and took off the main castle of Purple Light House, and that creates an angry reaction from the Purple Light House. Finally, in the second night's campfire, the invader of Orange House officially apologized to the Purple Light House's leader and stops the consortium from collapsing. However, this surely affected the outcome as Purple Light and Orange Flower both failed to earn a Star reward.

House and squad structures 
Each house contains six to seven squads, and each house has the following positions:
 A House Leader who also is the Captain of his/her squad
 A Deputy House Leader who also is the Captain of his/her squad
 Six to seven Captains
Each squad contains four to six members, with following positions:
 Captain
 Deputy Captain
 Head of equipment
 Head of academics and secretary
Notably, members' amounts are not fixed. For instance, in 2015–16, Purple Light House only consisted five squads and 26 members because some of the members were kicked out of the straight-uppers list.

Basketball teams

Boys' basketball team (NanShan Leopard) 
NanShan High School boys' basketball team (often referred to as NanShan Leopard) is one of the most famous teams in the High School Basketball League (HBL). In 2016 the team received its 7th title in HBL and this remains its most titles honor. (Song-Shan Senior High school has five as the closest competitor after a 74–62 win in the final against reigning champion NanShan.)

For reference please check Nan Shan High School boys' basketball team.

Girls' basketball team (NanShan Leopard) 
In 1979 Nanshan co-operates with China Telecom women's basketball team and established a girls' basketball team, which was often referred to as "The Lil' Telecom". The best result of the team came from Year 2000 in which the team finished with title. However the next year China Telecom decided to end the co-operation and the team no longer existed.

On Dec 5 1014, China Telecom signed a co-operation with Nanshan again and girls' basketball team was re-established and names as NanShan Sheep. The first year of the team participated in the highest tier, and they finished in fourth place despite having only nine Year 10 students. It was predicted that the team had much potential.

In November 2016, in order to unite the mascot of NanShan, the sheep was officially replaced by the leopard, so both boys' and girls' team are now represented by leopard. NanShan girls' basketball team advanced to the semi-final despite mutual injuries, but lost consecutively in the semis and third placement game, finishing fourth.

Other special groups in NanShan

NanShan High School Fans Group 
NanShan High School Fans Group (Mandarin: 南山中學粉絲應援團, often referred to as NSSHFans）is a fanpage and in-real-life group on Facebook. It was founded in 2010, and the founded logo was "我 (Heart symbol)南山"(I love Nanshan), then it was changed to a puzzle style to symbolize the unity of NanShan-ers. The responsibility of the group is to "Unite the power of NanShan-ers" and it is a non-profit organization in the purpose of offering a platform for graduated students and in school students and staff to communicate. It normally shares the post of NanShan High School and relative news, but it also holds different activities, such as "The Uniform Day", "HBL gathering" and "Rescue our MIDTERM!" activity.

The founded reason 
As the result of holding "The Uniform Day", NanShan Fan's group's predecessor—Nan Shan Fan's page was built. Soon it became more relevant in more topic, sharing different posts and held different kinds of activities.

Starting from 2011, due to graduated students have insufficient news from school, NSSHFans started to recruit volunteers from school in order to provide a broad picture of the entire school community. They even established a committee in school to discuss activities with the students.

NSSHFans is the first unofficial group created and the first platform for everyone to have an equal chance to speak.

Group role in school 
The administrators of the group are former NanShan students. The group prompt to side with students more, but also have a policy to not obey or against the school. When students and school have communication problems, the group will collect the suggestions from the students and submit it to the school authority.

NanShan HBL Theme Video 
NanShan Fans group product an annual video named "NanShan HBL Theme Video". The first episode was made in 2010. The video collects the visual of students and teachers cheering for the school team in order to courage the Leopards to play nice in game. That episode starts with principal's encouragement and ended with the press to the coach and players.

The video was published on February 25, 2011. It was not only played in the network platform, but also co-operated with the sections in school to play in NanShan's TV channel. It earned a great amount of notice and praise.

NSMUN 
Nanshan High School has a model United Nations club, and they hold an international MUN named NSMUN annually. They also send many students to various conferences to debate with MUNners from different schools.

Sports team in NanShan 
Besides basketball, NanShan also has a soccer team, badminton team, handball team, baseball team, etc. Note that clubs and teams are different as school team is the one which represents the school in contests. Badminton, soccer and baseball team are recruited by team scouts, while the basketball team and handball team are recruited before the player entered NSSH.

Academic teams in NanShan 
NanShan mainly focuses on sending students to the national spelling bee contest and speech contest. Recently a new diplomacy contest also attracted the school's attention, following up with an English debating team. The debate team advanced through regional into national final in the first year of establishment. The school also pushes students to participate in scientific contest or math contest, while the participants are mostly from the first tier class.

Club, co-curricular activities and oversea trips 
NanShan High School ruled that on every other week's Wednesdays for juniors and Fridays for seniors, there will be a club time. Following are the list of all the clubs. Students in Y9 and 12 are excluded from the clubs.

Junior Department

Senior Department

Special clubs for Years 9 and 12 
 Graduation club: A special committee for students to discuss affairs relative to graduation including ceremony, yearbooks, gift, songs, etc. Each class elects four delegates.

Co-curriculum activities 
There are a variety of selections of CCA in day and night time, some are sports such as soccer, badminton, basketball, table tennis and aerobics; some are linguistics such as French, Spanish, Turkish, Russian, German, Arabic, and Adv. English; some are computer-relative such as Scratch, C++, Python, Arduino, and Web Design; some are music relative from ukulele to violin; and there were a lot more in existence. These activities are apart from clubs and generally use night time of 5:40 dismissal night which means students have to volunteer to stay at school in order to take the lesson they are interested in.

Overseas education trips and exchange program

Outbound 

NanShan has several ally schools around the world. Generally, every July, the school organises trips to Canada (Toronto), the West Coast in the US and England. About 20 students are allowed to go on each trip. Prior to the trip, students need to attend pre-trip briefings and pass a test. These trips are usually like normal ESL trips (during which students go to a school campus, attend lessons for half a day, then go for outings after that). It costs a lot to go for these trips. Hence,  most of the students prefer not to go because of the cost and also because the trip would take up the majority of their summer break.

Every August, the school nominates a few MUNners (students who participate in the Model United Nations) to take part in PKMUN, GLEMUN and similar events. Normally, it lasts eight days - four days for the conference and four days for outings. These events take place either during regular class time or during the summer break.

Nan Shan Senior High School sends students to Hwa Chong Institution every August as part of an exchange program that started when two schools became ally schools (2004). Every November, the school sends students to Japan and Peking, and in every March, to New Zealand. These trips are more of a sightseeing nature, rather than school-oriented programs.

Inbound 

Nan Shan has two inbound exchange programs per year as of 2016: with Queensland in September and Hwa Chong Institution in November.  Currently, the Hwa Chong program is the only one that is two-way (inbound and outbound). These programs are all organized by the school's CCA department.

Ally schools 
  Hwa Chong Institution (A)
  New Asia Middle School 
  Yu Tsai Elementary School
   Heretaunga College (B) (C)
  Urawagakuin High School (B)
  Tianjin 1st Middle School (A)
  Shan Hi Jin Yuan Middle School (C)
  No.1 Senior High School of Ürümqi
  Tianjin yizhong middle school
  Harbin No.14 Middle School
   Xi'An NO.83 Middle School
  Mingde middle school (B)
  Wenshan Middle School (B)
  Changyi NO.1 Mmiddle School, Shandong Province (B)
  Taizhou No.2 Middle School (B)
  Weifang NO.1 Middle School (B)
  Nanjing No.9 Middle School (B)
Despite these schools, since NanShan is one of the best private schools in the city, many schools from China send their school managing team to spectate the operation of NSSH.
Note: 
(A) means the school has regular exchanging students program with each other,
(B) means the ally relation was built in current principal Mr. Tsai's era,
(C) means the school has exchanging students program (Whether one-way or duo) in the past three years but not held regularly.

NanShan also hosts an annual principal forum to discuss issues regarding to school management. In 2016, they invited schools from HK, SG, China and Taiwan to join the conference.

Places around the school 
 New Taipei City JhangHe Junior High school
 Nan-Shi-Jiao River
 Fu-Hei Temple
 Fu-Dei Temple
 Guan-Ji Temple
 Farmers' Alliance of Zhong He 
 New Taipei City ZhongHe Elementary School
 ZhongHe District multiple sports center
 ZhongHe District governor's office
 ZhongHe 1st police office
 Power Center (shopping)
 RT-Mart ZhongHe store
 MRT Yongan Market station
 National Taiwan Library
 823 Memorial Park (Zhong He 4th park)

References

External links 
 NanShan High School Official Page
 NanShan 2016 HBL Theme song
 NanShan Fan's Group│Facebook
 NanShan Model United Nation Official Page│NSMUN
 NanShan Leopard Basketball Team
 NanShan School Official Fan page

Educational institutions established in 1946
High schools in Taiwan
Schools in New Taipei
1946 establishments in China